Bill Lake ( W.F. Lake) is a Canadian actor whose career began in Vancouver and who has appeared in many movies, television movies and series, stage plays and commercials. He has over 175 credits in a variety of productions since the 1970s.

Career
Among his television credits are appearances in shows such as Monk, Queer as Folk, Sue Thomas: F.B.Eye, Earth: Final Conflict and Stoked. His movie credits include roles in The Hurricane, Martin and Lewis, Flash of Genius, Stir of Echoes: The Homecoming, Apartment Hunting and The Middle Man. In 2001, Lake had a recurring role in the television series Soul Food as Mr. Greene.

Lake played the obsessed Detective Miller, who goes after the drug lord Luigi Saracino, in Adrian Langley's 2013 film Crook.
He also appeared in Johnathan Wright's 2018 film, Northern Lights of Christmas.

Filmography

Film

Television

References

External links
Bill Lake, Actor

Place of birth missing (living people)
Year of birth missing (living people)
Living people
Canadian male film actors
Canadian male stage actors
Canadian male television actors
Male actors from Vancouver